Centro Social e Desportivo de Câmara de Lobos is a Portuguese sports club, best known for its association football section, founded in Câmara de Lobos in 1977.

History
Founded on 28 September 1977, Câmara de Lobos' origins trace back to 1967, when a group of people had the willingness to create a football club.

Honours
AF Madeira Divisão de Honra: 2012–13, 2016–17, 2018–19
AF Madeira Primeira Divisão: 1988–89

References

Football clubs in Portugal
Association football clubs established in 1977
1977 establishments in Portugal
Câmara de Lobos